is a railway station on the Jōban Line in Katsushika, Tokyo, Japan, operated by East Japan Railway Company (JR East). The station is adjacent to Keisei Kanamachi Station operated by the Keisei Electric Railway.

Lines
Kanamachi Station is served by Jōban Line local services with through services to and from the Tokyo Metro Chiyoda Line.

Station layout
The station consists of an island platform serving two tracks for local services. There are also two tracks for Rapid services and three for freight services.

The station has a Midori no Madoguchi ticket office and a View Plaza travel agency.

Platforms

History
Kanamachi Station opened on 27 December 1897.

Passenger statistics
In fiscal 2010, the station was used by an average of 43,971 passengers daily (boarding passengers only).

Surrounding area
 Keisei Kanamachi Station (Keisei Kanamachi Line)
 Mizumoto Park
 Edogawa River
 National Route 6

See also
 List of railway stations in Japan

References

External links

 JR East station information 

Railway stations in Japan opened in 1897
Railway stations in Tokyo
Jōban Line
Stations of East Japan Railway Company